Terry Alexander may refer to:

Terry Alexander (baseball) (born 1955), American baseball coach
Terry Alexander (footballer) (1944–2013), Australian rules footballer for Collingwood
Terence Alexander (1923–2009), English actor in Bergerac
Terry Alexander (actor) (born 1947), American actor
Terry Alexander (politician) (born 1955), member of the South Carolina House of Representatives